The Winfield Cup was an Australian rugby league trophy awarded to the winner of the New South Wales Rugby League premiership (NSWRL) Grand Final from 1982 to 1994, and then to the winner of the newly-founded Australian Rugby League (ARL) Grand Final in 1995.

Despite its name, the trophy was retired after the 1995 ARL season when cigarette manufacturer Winfield was forced to withdraw their sponsorship, following the Australian Federal Government's introduction of the Tobacco Advertising Prohibition Act 1992 which outlawed tobacco advertising in sports in Australia. Winfield were not the first tobacco company to sponsor the NSWRL Premiership, however; from 1960 to 1981 the pre-season competition was sponsored by W. D. & H. O. Wills.

A redesigned ARL premiership trophy, the Optus Cup, was introduced in 1996 and lasted until 1997 before the ARL and Super League merged to form the National Rugby League (NRL) in 1998.

The Gladiators
The Winfield Cup trophy was a three-dimensional bronze cast of a famous photo called The Gladiators, which depicted a mud-soaked Norm Provan of St. George and Arthur Summons of Western Suburbs embracing after the 1963 Grand Final.  This image became symbolic of the camaraderie and 'mateship' in rugby league and the present-day National Rugby League Premiership Trophy (which evolved from the Winfield Cup) uses a similar design. The sculpture itself was designed by New Zealand-born sculptor Alan Ingham (b. 1920 – 1994).

Winners

See also

Rugby league in New South Wales

References

External links
'Rugby League Was Better When It Was The Winfield Cup' A Facebook group dedicated to the years of the Winfield Cup

Rugby league trophies and awards
Rugby league competitions in Australia
Tobacco advertising
Rugby league competitions in New South Wales
Recurring sporting events established in 1982
1982 establishments in Australia
Sports leagues established in 1982
Australian sports trophies and awards
New South Wales Rugby League premiership
National cup competitions